Gymnopilus pleurocystidiatus is a species of mushroom in the family Hymenogastraceae.

See also

List of Gymnopilus species

External links
Gymnopilus pleurocystidiatus at Index Fungorum

pleurocystidiatus
Fungi of North America